Variational transition-state theory is a refinement of transition-state theory.  When using transition-state theory to estimate a chemical reaction rate, the dividing surface is taken to be a surface that intersects a first-order saddle point and is also perpendicular to the reaction coordinate in all other dimensions.  When using variational transition-state theory, the position of the dividing surface between reactant and product regions is variationally optimized to minimize the reaction rate.  This minimizes the effects of recrossing, and gives a much more accurate result.

References

Chemical kinetics